Edmond Nicolas Laguerre (9 April 1834, Bar-le-Duc – 14 August 1886, Bar-le-Duc) was a French mathematician and a member of the Académie des sciences (1885). His main works were in the areas of geometry and complex analysis. He also investigated orthogonal polynomials (see Laguerre polynomials). Laguerre's method is a root-finding algorithm tailored to polynomials. He laid the foundations of a geometry of oriented spheres (Laguerre geometry and Laguerre plane), including the Laguerre transformation or transformation by reciprocal directions.

Works

Selection 
 

 Théorie des équations numériques, Paris: Gauthier-Villars. 1884 on Google Books
 
  Oeuvres de Laguerre publ. sous les auspices de l'Académie des sciences par MM. Charles Hermite, Henri Poincaré, et Eugène Rouché. (Paris, 1898-1905) (reprint:  New York : Chelsea publ., 1972 )

Extensive lists 
 More than 80 articles on Nundam.org.p

See also 
 Isotropic line
 q-Laguerre polynomials
 Big q-Laguerre polynomials
 Discrete Laguerre polynomials
 Gauss–Laguerre quadrature
 Laguerre-Gaussian modes
 Laguerre form
 Laguerre formula
 Laguerre group
 Laguerre's method
 Laguerre–Pólya class
 Laguerre plane
 Laguerre polynomials
 Laguerre transform
 Laguerre transformations
 Laguerre's theorem
 Laguerre–Forsyth invariant
 Laguerre–Samuelson inequality
 Laguerre–Voronoi diagram

References 
  "Nécrologie". In: Nouvelles annales de mathématiques, 3rd series, vol. 8 (1889), p. 494–496—Obituary

External links 
 

1834 births
1886 deaths
People from Bar-le-Duc
École Polytechnique alumni
Academic staff of the Collège de France
Members of the French Academy of Sciences
19th-century French mathematicians